Oswald Milne Bertram (17 April 1909 – 5 May 1983) was an Australian rules footballer who played with South Melbourne and St Kilda in the VFL during the 1930s.

Family
The son of Frank Ernest Bertram, and Agnes Bertram, née Milne, he was born at Upper Sturt on 17 April 1909. He married Grace Mary Orme in 1940.

Football
Bertram was a rover and was recruited from South Australian National Football League club West Torrens, where he was a leading player who twice represented South Australia at interstate level. He joined South Melbourne for the 1933 season and helped them to win the premiership, kicking 28 goals for the year.

Bertram, who had been unemployed for three years, was one of a number of interstate footballers who joined South Melbourne in the early 1930s, including Jack Wade and Wilbur Harris, also South Australians, with the promise of immediate, long-term, secure, paid employment outside of football within the (137 store) grocery empire of the South Melbourne president, South Melbourne Lord Mayor, and Member of the Victorian Legislative Council, Archie Crofts. The collection of players recruited from interstate became known as South Melbourne's "Foreign Legion".

After playing in a losing Grand Final the following season he moved to St Kilda in 1935, spending two seasons there.

Military service
He enlisted in the Second AIF on 15 July 1940, eventually retiring from the armed services, with the rank of Major in the Royal Australian Army Ordnance Corps, on 18 April 1959.

Notes

External links

 Boyles Football Photos: Ossie Bertram.

1909 births
1983 deaths
Australian rules footballers from Adelaide
Sydney Swans players
Sydney Swans Premiership players
St Kilda Football Club players
West Torrens Football Club players
One-time VFL/AFL Premiership players
Australian Army personnel of World War II
Australian Army officers
Military personnel from South Australia